Allardia is a genus of flowering plants in the daisy family described as a genus in 1841.

Allardia is native to Tibet and Central Asia.

 Species
 Allardia lasiocarpa (G.X.Fu) K.Bremer & Humphries - Tibet
 Allardia transalaica (Tzvelev) K.Bremer & Humphries - Central Asia

References

Anthemideae
Asteraceae genera
Taxa named by Joseph Decaisne